was a Japanese Nihonga painter and designer.

He received a commission to decorate the Take-no-ma audience room of the Tokyo Imperial Palace, a hall that has an area of 182 square meters, or 55 tsubo. The piece “Take” depicts bamboo. The hall also features works by Tatsuaki Kuroda and Hajime Kato.

His work is a part of the collection of the Menard Art Museum, the Osaka City Museum of Modern Art, and the National Museum of Modern Art, Kyoto.

See also 
 Seison Maeda (1885–1977), one of the leading Nihonga painters
 List of Nihonga painters

References

External links 
 Japan Times | “The 120th Anniversary of the Birth of Fukuda Heihachiro: The Modern Nihonga, a Novel Sense of Design”
 Artnet | Heihachiro Fukuda

1892 births
1974 deaths
Recipients of the Order of Culture
People from Ōita Prefecture
20th-century Japanese painters